Khabarsky (masculine), Khabarskaya (feminine), or Khabarskoye (neuter) may refer to:
Khabarsky District, a district in Altai Krai, Russia
Khabarskoye, a rural locality (a village) in Nizhny Novgorod Oblast, Russia